Kenneth Fraser was an  Australian surgeon and soldier

Kenneth Fraser may also refer to:

 Kenneth Boyd Fraser, British virologist
 Kenneth Grant Fraser, Scottish missionary and doctor